Compañía Nacional de Chocolates de Perú S.A. is a food and beverage company headquartered in Lima, Peru. Compañía Nacional de Chocolates de Perú S.A. was incorporated February 1, 2007 as a subsidiary of the parent company Grupo Nutresa S.A. owned by Colombian conglomerate Grupo Empresarial Antioqueño.

Winter's brand
Winter's is a popular Peruvian brand of chocolates and other food products owned by Compañía Nacional de Chocolates de Perú S.A.  The Winter's brand was started in 1997 by Lima-based Good Foods S.A., the largest Peruvian exporter of chocolates.  On February 1, 2007, Colombian-based food conglomerate Grupo Nacional de Chocolates (now Grupo Nutresa) purchased Good Foods S.A. and its Winter's brand for US$36 million through its Peruvian subsidiary Compañía Nacional de Chocolates de Perú S.A.  Winter's has more than forty brands in its portfolio of products: cocoas, milk modifiers, chocolates, cookies, candies, gums, lozenges, chewing gum, icings, cream confections, marshmallows, and panettone.

See also 
 Chocopunch — company product.
 Winter's — primary line of products.

References

External links 
 Compañía Nacional de Chocolates de Perú S.A. Official Site

Peruvian chocolate companies
Food and drink companies established in 2007
Companies based in Lima
2007 establishments in Peru